Pseudocampylaea lowii is an extinct species of air-breathing land snail, a terrestrial pulmonate gastropod mollusc in the family Hygromiidae, the hairy snails and their allies.

Distribution
This species was endemic to Madeira, Portugal.

References

Hygromiidae
Extinct gastropods
Gastropods described in 1835
Taxobox binomials not recognized by IUCN